The 1992 Washington gubernatorial election was held on November 3, 1992. Incumbent Democratic Governor Booth Gardner chose not to run for a third term. This resulted in an open race for Governor of Washington in which Democrat Mike Lowry narrowly defeated Republican Ken Eikenberry.

Blanket primary

Candidates

Democratic 
Mike Lowry, former U.S. Representative for the 7th congressional district and unsuccessful Democratic nominee for the United States Senate in 1988
Joseph E. King, speaker state representative
Sally McQuown
Richard "Onery Dick" Short

Republican 
Ken Eikenberry, State Attorney General
Sid Morrison, U.S. Representative for the 4th congressional district
Dan McDonald, state senator

Results

General election

Candidates
Mike Lowry (D), former U.S. Representative for the 7th congressional district
Ken Eikenberry (R), State Attorney General

Debates 
Complete video of debate, October 27, 1992 - C-SPAN

Polling

Endorsements

Results

References

1992
1992 United States gubernatorial elections

Gubernatorial